Bharath Kumar (born 9 April 1995), professionally known as Master Bharath, is an Indian actor who works prominently in Tamil and Telugu films. He debuted in the film industry with the film Naina (2002) starring Jayaram. Since then he has acted in more than 62 films. He won two Nandi awards as best child actor for the films Ready (2008) and Bindaas (2010).

Filmography

Films

Television
 My Dear Bootham (2004-2007)
 Raja Rajashwari (2004-2007)

Awards
Nandi Awards
 Best Child Actor - Ready
 Best Child Actor - Bindaas
Government of Tamil Nadu
Best Child Artiste - My Dear Bootham

References

External links
 
 http://www.idlebrain.com/celeb/interview/bharat-childartist.html
 http://www.telugumovietalkies.com/comedian-master-bharat-profile/

Telugu comedians
Telugu male actors
Living people
Tamil comedians
Male actors in Tamil cinema
Male actors in Telugu cinema
Indian male film actors
1995 births
Indian male child actors